Wim Kras (5 February 1944 – 14 February 2023) was a Dutch footballer who played as a forward for Volendam.

Club career
Kras joined the academy at hometown club Volendam, making his debut for the club on 22 November 1959 in a 3–0 loss against Ajax. As a result of starting the game, Kras became the youngest player in Eredivisie history, at the age of 15 years and 290 days, a record that still stands to this day. On 15 May 1960, Kras broke another Eredivisie record, becoming the league's youngest goalscorer during a 3–1 loss against MVV Maastricht, at the age of 16 years and 100 days. During his career, Kras made 400 league appearances for Volendam, scoring 90 times.

International career
Kras represented the Netherlands at under-16 and under-18 level.

Personal life and death
Kras died on 14 February 2023, at the age of 79.

References

1944 births
2023 deaths
People from Volendam
Dutch footballers
Footballers from North Holland
Association football forwards
Netherlands youth international footballers
Eredivisie players
Eerste Divisie players
FC Volendam players